Tadgh Deasy (born 1998) is an Irish dual player who plays hurling with Blackrock and Gaelic football with St. Michael's. He is a former member of the Cork senior hurling team.

Career statistics

Club

Inter-county

Honours
Blackrock
Cork Premier Senior Hurling Championship: 2020

References

1998 births
Living people
UCC hurlers
Blackrock National Hurling Club hurlers
St Michael's (Cork) Gaelic footballers
Cork inter-county hurlers